Topaz is a 1999 album by cellist Erik Friedlander which was released on the Siam label and features the quartet that became known as Topaz.

Reception

The Allmusic review by Alex Henderson awarded the album 4 stars stating "Topaz, like a lot of avant-garde jazz, isn't easy to absorb on the first listen. But the more times you listen, the more you realize how much this left-of-center CD has going for it".

Track listing
All compositions by Erik Friedlander except as indicated
 "Verdine" - 5:37
 "November" - 4:20
 "Shining" - 6:10
 "Straw Dogs" - 7:29
 "Topaz" - 2:49
 "Three Desperate Men" - 3:31
 "Tout de Suite" (Miles Davis) - 8:29
 "Hat and Beard" (Eric Dolphy) - 4:45
 "Something Sweet, Something Tender / Cienega" (Dolphy / Friedlander) - 6:59
 "Agon" - 5:56

Personnel
Erik Friedlander – cello
Andy Laster - alto saxophone
Stomu Takeishi - bass
Satoshi Takeishi - percussion

References 

1999 albums
Erik Friedlander albums